Joseph-Éloi Fontaine (September 14, 1865 – June 11, 1930) was a physician and political figure in Quebec. He represented Hull in the House of Commons of Canada from 1917 to 1930 as a Liberal.

He was born in Beloeil, Canada East, the son of Charles Fontaine, and was educated in Marieville. He served on the town council for Hull from 1904 to 1908 and was mayor in 1909 and 1910. He also served as chairman of the Hull Board of Trade and chairman of the Medical Board of the Hull Hospital. Fontaine was elected as a Laurier Liberal in 1917.

References 

Members of the House of Commons of Canada from Quebec
Liberal Party of Canada MPs
1865 births
1930 deaths